Pennsburg is a borough in Montgomery County, Pennsylvania. Its population was 3,889 at the 2020 census. It is part of the Upper Perkiomen School District.  It is also part of the strip of small towns that run together along Route 29: Red Hill, Pennsburg, and East Greenville. The towns are collectively referred to as Upper Perk.

Geography
Pennsburg is located at  (40.395595, −75.497361). A nature preserve is along Macoby Creek.

The borough has a hot-summer, humid continental climate (Dfa) and average monthly temperatures range from 29.9°F in January to 74.6°F in July. The USDA hardiness zone is 7a.

Demographics

As of the 2010 census, the borough was 90.0% White, 2.0% Black or African American, 0.1% Native American, 5.2% Asian, 0.1% Native Hawaiian, and 1.4% of two or more races. About 4.1% of the population were of Hispanic or Latino ancestry.

As of the 2000 census,  2,732 people, 1,009 households, and 705 families resided in the borough. The population density was 3,567.8 people per square mile (1,369.9/km2). The 1,078 housing units averaged 1,407.8 per square mile (540.5/km2). The racial makeup of the borough was 97.36% White, 0.81% African American, 0.07% Native American, 0.48% Asian, 0.55% from other races, and 0.73% from two or more races. Hispanics or Latinos of any race were 1.61% of the population.

Of the 1,009 households, 38.1% had children under the age of 18 living with them, 55.2% were married couples living together, 9.8% had a female householder with no husband present, and 30.1% were not families. About 24.0% of all households were made up of individuals, and 8.5% had someone living alone who was 65 years of age or older. The average household size was 2.59 and the average family size was 3.08.

In the borough, the population was age distributed as 27.0% under the age of 18, 7.4% from 18 to 24, 33.1% from 25 to 44, 18.4% from 45 to 64, and 14.1% who were 65 years of age or older. The median age was 35 years. For every 100 females, there were 90.4 males. For every 100 females age 18 and over, there were 90.9 males.

The median income for a household in the borough was $46,715, and for a family was $56,250. Males had a median income of $37,036 versus $26,190 for females. The per capita income for the borough was $18,977. About 4.4% of families and 6.2% of the population were below the poverty line, including 6.3% of those under age 18 and 3.7% of those age 65 or over.

Transportation

Pennsburg lies at the junction of Pennsylvania Route 29 and Pennsylvania Route 663. PA 29 follows Main Street on a northwest-to-southeast alignment through town, while PA 663 follows Pottstown Avenue and Quakertown Avenue on a northeast-to-southwest alignment.

Politics and government
Pennsburg has a city manager form of government with a mayor and borough council.  
The borough is part of the Pennsylvania's 4th Congressional District (represented by Rep. Madeleine Dean), Pennsylvania's 131st Representative District (represented by Rep. Milou Mackenzie), and  Pennsylvania Senate, District 24 (represented by Sen. Bob Mensch).

Borough officials
Mayor: 
Charles Shagg

Council:
Diane L. Stevens, President 
Patrick Suter, Vice-President 
Maggie Hange 
Michael R. Mensch
F. Robert Seville
Wayne Stevens 
Joan Wieder

References

External links

 
 Borough of Pennsburg
 Borough Fact Sheet

1887 establishments in Pennsylvania
Boroughs in Montgomery County, Pennsylvania
Populated places established in 1887